Okot p'Bitek (7 June 1931 – 19 July 1982) was a Ugandan poet, who achieved wide international recognition for Song of Lawino, a long poem dealing with the tribulations of a rural African wife whose husband has taken up urban life and wishes everything to be westernised. Song of Lawino was originally written in the Acholi dialect of Southern Luo, translated by the author into English, and published in 1966. It was a breakthrough work, creating an audience among anglophone Africans for direct, topical poetry in English; and incorporating traditional attitudes and thinking in an accessible yet faithful literary vehicle. It was followed by the Song of Ocol (1970), the husband's reply.

The "East African Song School" or "Okot School poetry" is now an academic identification of the work following his direction, also popularly called "comic singing": a forceful type of dramatic verse monologue rooted in traditional song and phraseology.

Early life 

Okot p'Bitek was born in 1931 in Gulu, in the North Uganda grasslands. His father, Jebedayo Opi, was a schoolteacher, while his mother, Lacwaa Cerina, was a traditional singer, storyteller and dancer. His ethnic background was Acholi, and he wrote first in the Acholi dialect, also known as Lwo. Acholi is a dialect of Southern Luo, one of the Western Nilotic languages.

At school he was noted as a singer, dancer, drummer and athlete. He was educated at Gulu High School, then at King's College, Budo, where he composed an opera based on traditional songs. He went on to study at universities in the United Kingdom.

University 
He travelled abroad first as a player with the Ugandan national football team, in 1958. He gave up on football as a possible career, stayed in Britain, and studied education at the University of Bristol and then law at the University of Wales, Aberystwyth. He then took a Bachelor of Letters degree in social anthropology at the University of Oxford, with a 1963 dissertation on Acholi and Lango traditional cultures.

It is reported that Oxford deliberately failed his Ph.D. in 1970. The dissertation was published nearly unchanged in 1971 as The Religion of the Central Luo by a Kenyan publisher.

According to George Heron, p'Bitek lost his commitment to Christian belief during these years. This had major consequences for his attitude as a scholar of African tradition, which was by no means accepting of the general run of earlier work, or what he called "dirty gossip" in relation to tribal life. His character Lawino also speaks for him, in some places, on these matters.

Career 
He wrote an early novel, Lak Tar Miyo Kinyero Wi Lobo (1953), in Lwo, later translated into English as White Teeth. It concerns the experiences of a young Acholi man moving away from home, to find work and so a wife. Okot p'Bitek organised an arts festival at Gulu, and then at Kisumu. Subsequently he taught at Makerere University (1964–66) and then was Director of Uganda's National Theatre and National Cultural Centre (1966–68).

He became unpopular with the Ugandan government, and took teaching posts outside the country. He took part in the International Writing Program at the University of Iowa in 1969. He was at the Institute of African Studies of University College, Nairobi from 1971 as a senior research fellow and lecturer, with visiting positions at University of Texas at Austin and University of Ife in Nigeria in 1978/9. He remained in exile during the regime of Idi Amin, returning in 1982 to Makerere University, to teach creative writing. He participated in the inaugural International Book Fair of Radical Black and Third World Books in London in April 1982, when he performed extracts from his poems "Song of Lawino" and "Song of Ocol" in what would be his last public appearance.

Apart from his poetry and novels, he also took part in an ongoing debate about the integrity of scholarship on traditional African religion, with the assertion in African Religions in Western Scholarship (1971) that scholars centred on European concerns were "intellectual smugglers". His point, aimed partly at Africans who had had a training in Christian traditions, was that it led to a concentration on matters distant from the actual concerns of Africans; this has been contested by others. He was an atheist.

Death 
He died in Kampala of a stroke in 1982. He was survived by daughters Agnes Oyella, Jane Okot p'Bitek who wrote a Song of Farewell (1994), Olga Okot Bitek Ojelel and Cecilia Okot Bitek who work as nurses, Juliane Okot Bitek who writes poetry, and a son George Okot p'Bitek, who is a teacher in Kampala. Olga, Cecilia, and Juliane all live in Vancouver, British Columbia, Canada. In 2004 Juliane was the recipient of an award in the Commonwealth Short Story Contest for her story "Going Home". These are the daughters of his wife Caroline.

Works

Lak Tar Miyo Kinyero Wi Lobo (1953); novel in Luo, English translation White Teeth
Song of Lawino: A Lament (East Africa Publishing House, 1966); poem, translation by author of a Luo original Wer pa Lawino
Wer pa Lawino (East Africa Publishing House, 1969). The Defence of Lawino, alternate translation by Taban Lo Liyong (2001)
Song of Ocol (East Africa Publishing House, 1970); poem, written in English
Religion of the Central Luo (1971)
Two Songs: Song of a Prisoner, Song of Malaya (1971); poems
African Religions in Western Scholarship (1971, Nairobi)
Africa's Cultural Revolution (1973); essays
Horn of My Love; translations of traditional oral verse. London: Heinemann Educational Books, 1974. 
Hare and Hornbill (1978) folktale collection
Acholi Proverbs (1985)
Artist, the Ruler: Essays on Art, Culture and Values (1986)
Modern Cookery

Further reading

 Lara Rosenoff Gauvin, "In and Out of Culture: Okot p’Bitek’s Work and Social Repair in Post-Conflict Acoliland", Oral Tradition 28/1 (2013): 35–54 (available online)
 George A. Heron, The Poetry of Okot p'Bitek (1976)
 Gerald Moore, Twelve African Writers (1980)
 Monica Nalyaka Wanambisi, Thought and Technique in the Poetry of Okot p'Bitek (1984)
 Molara Ogundipe-Leslie and Ssalongo Theo Luzuuka (eds), Cultural Studies in Africa : Celebrating Okot p'Bitek and Beyond (1997 Symposium, University of Transkei)
 Samuel Oluoch Imbo, Oral Traditions As Philosophy: Okot P'Bitek's Legacy for African Philosophy (2002)

References

External links
 Jane Musoke-Nteyafas, "One on One with Juliane Bitek, Author, Poet and Daughter of the Legendary Okot p'BiteK", AfroLit, 18 August 2008.
https://www.theeastafrican.co.ke/magazine/Okot-p-Bitek-sang-songs-from-the-source-/434746-1941212-2vivniz/index.html

1931 births
1982 deaths
People from Gulu District
Acholi people
Ugandan atheists
Ugandan male poets
Alumni of the University of Bristol
Alumni of Aberystwyth University
Alumni of the University of Oxford
Academic staff of Makerere University
20th-century Ugandan poets
International Writing Program alumni
20th-century male writers
Academic staff of the University of Nairobi
Ugandan expatriates in the United Kingdom
Ugandan expatriates in the United States
Ugandan expatriates in Kenya
Ugandan expatriates in Nigeria